Victorino Mapa High School (formerly Manila East High School), situated in San Miguel, Manila, is one of the oldest public high schools in the city. It has produced a list of successful graduates in various fields since its foundation in 1923.

Along with Manila Science High School, Ramon Magsaysay High School, Manuel Roxas High School, Arellano (Manila North) High School, and Araullo High School, Victorino Mapa offers rigorous Special Science courses to selected top students. The institution is considered one of the top schools in Manila in terms of its performance in achievement tests and competitions. In 2007, VMHS was named one of the cleanest schools in Manila.

History

Victorino Mapa High School opened its first classes (Manila East High School) as one of the four schools in City of Manila together with Torres High School (Manila South High School) and Arellano (Manila North) High School in June 1923.

The school has been under the administration of principals since it was founded in June 1923. The three of these were Americans namely, John Carl, Sarah M. England and James Burns. The first Filipino principal was Indalecio Madamba, installed in 1951. In his term, the Parents-Teachers Association was organized and succession of principals took over, after Madamba retired in May 1956.

Student population of VMHS traditionally come from the district of San Miguel, Quiapo, Sampaloc and Santa Mesa consisting of family homogenous in economic and social standards with a few transferees from provinces and graduate from Padre Burgos Elementary School (PBES) of Principal Ms. Trinidad R. Galang. in Altura St. Sta Mesa, Manila.

The school once had a biggest student population of 11,481 with a faculty of 488. Victorino Mapa at present boasts of a big and well-equipped auditorium (now known as ''"Bulwagang Velayo").

Academics

Regular Curriculum

Special Science Curriculum 
The establishment of the Special Science curriculum is spearheaded by the Department of Science and Technology- Science Education Institute, with the first batch being accepted in first year high school level in 1969. For the moment, support form DOST has been withdrawn and Special Science classes are maintained by the Division of City Schools in the implementing schools namely Manuel A. Roxas High School, Ramon Magsaysay High School, Victorino Mapa High School, Arellano High School and Araullo High School, with the exception of Manila Science High School which is a recognized science high school.

To be eligible for the Special Science sections, applicants must have final grades no lower than 85 in Science, Math and English and 83 in other subjects. They are subjected to examination which includes knowledge of Sciences and use of Abstract Reasoning.

Successful applicants are then provided with elective subjects to fulfill the aim of the program, which is to give the students good grounding in Science, as well as in other subject areas. Thus, students are expected to have more than 11 subjects, all while maintaining good academic standing and participating in extra curricular activities. Students who fail to maintain a GPA higher than the expected minimum grade, which is set by the school, are removed from the Special Science section the following year and are transferred to an appropriate regular section. This is also especially true for those students who receive a grade lower than 80 in any subjects being taken.

Various electives are limited only to Special Science students and are not offered to students of regular sections. Such subjects are the following: Computer Programming, Research, Statistics, Advance Biology (Biotechnology), Advance Chemistry, Speech Delivery and Debate, Earth and Environmental Science, Creative Writing, Pre-Calculus and Analytic Geometry, and Journalism*.

Journalism is the only elective not required for the Special Science students to take, since they are already taking Computer Science. However, those who chose to take it otherwise may participate in various writing contests within the Manila School Division. Selected students may also represent their school at Regional Journalism contests which are conducted throughout the school year. Regular students who wish to take this subject as their elective are free to do so, and could take the class together with all SS students who are taking this also. While all Journalism student submit an article for the school paper on a regular basis, not all could get their articles get published. Those whose articles are not chosen are then responsible for the layout of the school paper and other technical stuff regarding the publishing.

There are only two Special Science sections in Victorino Mapa High School per year level: SS1 and SS2.

Current Department Heads/OIC and Master Teacher, Principal

Boys and Girls Week 2018 
The annual Boys and Girls Week celebrated on December 7–14, 2018 with the Theme: "Kumikilos ng Kabataang Maynila : Kabalikat sa Makakalikasang Pagsulong at Likas-Kayang Pag-unlad."

Notable alumni 

Arturo M. Tolentino - 9th Vice President of the Philippines, Senate President.
Jose Melo  - Former Commission on Elections (Comelec) chairman & retired Supreme Court Justice
Levi Celerio - Composer, lyricist and National Artist for Music and Literature 1997
Rico J. Puno - Singer and Celebrity
Artemio Panganiban - former Supreme Court Justice
Ogie Diaz - Comedian, actor, talk show host and columnist.
Washington SyCip - accountant and co-founder of SGV & Co. Accounting Firm
Ernesto Diokno - Police General, former Chief of Manila Police District
Zacarias S. Chavez, Jr. – Commander, U.S. Coast Guard, Chief of Electronics Engineering Division at the U.S. Coast Guard Electronics Engineering Center, Wildwood, NJ, U.S.A., 1987

References

Educational institutions established in 1923
Education in San Miguel, Manila
High schools in Manila
Public schools in Metro Manila
1923 establishments in the Philippines